"Distant Drum" is a song recorded by Canadian country music artist Jim Witter. It was released in 1993 as the second single from his debut album, Jim Witter. It peaked at number 4 on the RPM Country Tracks chart in September 1993.

Chart performance

Year-end charts

References

Songs about drums
1993 songs
1993 singles
Jim Witter songs
Songs written by Jim Witter
FRE Records singles